Ashland Avenue Baptist Church is a registered historic church building in Toledo, Ohio.

History 
The Ashland Avenue Baptist Church was organized in 1886 by a group of Sunday School workers. The building was designed by architect David L. Stine and dedicated in 1896. It was added to the National Register of Historic Places on November 26, 1980. In 2005 the congregation voted to sell the building to Ebenezer Missionary Baptist Church, and moved first to Holland, Ohio then to Oregon, Ohio where it is now called Ashland Church.

References

External links

Churches on the National Register of Historic Places in Ohio
Churches in Toledo, Ohio
National Register of Historic Places in Lucas County, Ohio